The 1985 Brantford municipal election was held on November 12, 1985, to elect a mayor, city councillors, and school trustees in Brantford, Ontario, Canada. The rural and small-town communities surrounding Brantford also held elections on the same day.

Results

Andy Woolley was a perennial candidate who ran for mayor of Brantford in 1978, 1980, 1982 and 1985. He was described as a school caretaker in 1980.

Tom Potter used the slogan, "Active Representative, Accessible Alderman" in the 1985 campaign. Three years later, he wrote a letter to The Globe and Mail criticizing a requirement that all members of the Legislative Assembly of Ontario and their families be required to declare their assets. Potter described as an invasion of privacy.
Paul Mellor appears to have been a first-time candidate for public office. He is not the same person as a Paul Mellor from Niagara Falls who was accused of murder in 2009.

Yvonne McMahon ran for Brantford's fifth ward in 1976 and 1985, losing both times. She also ran a protest campaign for mayor of Brantford in 1982, finishing a distant second against incumbent Dave Neumann.

References

1985 elections in Canada
1985
1985 in Ontario